Ernest James Unwin (18 September 1912 – 23 November 2003) was an English rugby union international. He also played first-class cricket for Essex.

Unwin, a pacy winger and capable drop-kicker, won his first cap for England in their 1937 Home Nations Championship win over Scotland, scoring a try to help them claim the Triple Crown. He had previously toured Argentina with the British Lions in 1936 and in 1938 travelled to South Africa with the British Lions, playing two Tests. Also in 1938, he appeared in all three internationals in that year's Home Nations Championship. An amateur, he played his club rugby for Rosslyn Park. World War II ended Unwin's sporting career as he joined the army and remained with them until his retirement in 1949, having reached the rank of Lieutenant-Colonel.

On the cricket field, Unwin made seven first-class appearances with Essex throughout the 1930s. The Haileybury educated sportsman also played a bit of cricket for Suffolk in the Minor Counties His brother Frederick Unwin was a more successful cricketer, playing 53 first-class matches for Essex.

References

1912 births
2003 deaths
British & Irish Lions rugby union players from England
Cricketers from Essex
England international rugby union players
English cricketers
English rugby union players
Essex cricketers
Rosslyn Park F.C. players
Rugby union players from Essex
Suffolk cricketers
Rugby union wings